Raúl Alberto Romero (born March 11, 1935) is an Argentine former wrestler. He competed at the 1964 Summer Olympics both in freestyle and Greco-Roman wrestling, but lost all his matches.

References

Living people
Olympic wrestlers of Argentina
Wrestlers at the 1964 Summer Olympics
Argentine male sport wrestlers
1935 births
20th-century Argentine people
21st-century Argentine people